Musto is both an Italian and English surname (from different sources) and can refer to:

People with the surname
 Adrian Musto, Italian director of photography
 Alissa Musto, American singer and pianist
 Arnold Musto (born 1883), British civil engineer who designed the Sukkur Barrage
 Biagio Musto, bishop of Sora-Aquino-Pontecorvo (1952-1971) 
 Franklyn Musto, English athlete at the 1964 Olympics
 Glenn Musto, singer-songwriter of pop band College Fall
 Keith Musto, British sailor at the 1964 Olympics.
 Manuel Musto, Argentinian impressionist painter
 Matthew Musto, known as Blackbear, American hip-hop artist
 Michael Musto, Italian-American writer 
 Raphael J. Musto or Ray Musto, American politician from Pennsylvania
 Tony Musto (1915-1994), Italian-American heavyweight boxer
 William Musto, politician from New Jersey

Others
 Musto (company), an outdoor clothing company headquartered in England 
 Musto Skiff, a single-handed sailing skiff

See also
Mustoe, Highland County, Virginia, an unincorporated community in Virginia, USA